In mathematical analysis, the alternating series test is the method used to show that an alternating series is convergent when its terms (1) decrease in absolute value, and (2) approach zero in the limit.
The test was used by Gottfried Leibniz and is sometimes known as Leibniz's test, Leibniz's rule, or the Leibniz criterion. The test is only sufficient, not necessary, so some convergent alternating series may fail the first part of the test.

Formal Statement

Alternating series test 
A series of the form

where either all an are positive or all an are negative, is called an alternating series. 

The alternating series test guarantees that an alternating series converges if the following two conditions are met:

  decreases monotonically, i.e., and

Alternating series estimation theorem 
Moreover, let L denote the sum of the series, then the partial sum

approximates L with error bounded by the next omitted term:

Proof 
(The case  follows by taking the negative.)

Proof of the alternating series test 

The odd partial sums decrease monotonically: 

while the even partial sums increase monotonically:

 

both because an decreases monotonically with n. 

Moreover, since an are positive, . Thus we can collect these facts to form the following suggestive inequality:

Now, note that a1 − a2 is a lower bound of the monotonically decreasing sequence S2m+1, the monotone convergence theorem then implies that this sequence converges as m approaches infinity. Similarly, the sequence of even partial sum converges too.

Finally, they must converge to the same number because

Call the limit L, then the monotone convergence theorem also tells us extra information that 

 

for any m. This means the partial sums of an alternating series also "alternates" above and below the final limit. More precisely, when there is an odd (even) number of terms, i.e. the last term is a plus (minus) term, then the partial sum is above (below) the final limit. 

This understanding leads immediately to an error bound of partial sums, shown below.

Proof of the alternating series estimation theorem 

We would like to show  by splitting into two cases.

When k = 2m+1, i.e. odd, then

When k = 2m, i.e. even, then

as desired. 

Both cases rely essentially on the last inequality derived in the previous proof.

For an alternative proof using Cauchy's convergence test, see Alternating series.

For a generalization, see Dirichlet's test.

Examples

A typical example 
The alternating harmonic series meets both conditions for the alternating series test and converges.

An example to show monotonicity is needed 
All of the conditions in the test, namely convergence to zero and monotonicity, should be met in order for the conclusion to be true.
For example, take the series  

The signs are alternating and the terms tend to zero. However, monotonicity is not present and we cannot apply the test. Actually the series is divergent. Indeed, for the partial sum  we have  which is twice the partial sum of the harmonic series, which is divergent. Hence the original series is divergent.

The test is only sufficient, not necessary 

Leibniz test's monotonicity is not a necessary condition, thus the test itself is only sufficient, but not necessary. (The second part of the test is well known necessary condition of convergence for all series.)

See also 
Alternating series
Dirichlet's test

Notes
In practice, the first few terms may increase. What is important is that  for all  after some point, because the first finite amount of terms would not change a series' convergence/divergence.

References

 Konrad Knopp (1956) Infinite Sequences and Series, § 3.4, Dover Publications 
 Konrad Knopp (1990) Theory and Application of Infinite Series, § 15, Dover Publications 
James Stewart, Daniel Clegg, Saleem Watson (2016) Single Variable Calculus: Early Transcendentals (Instructor's Edition) 9E, Cengage ISBN 978-0-357-02228-9
 E. T. Whittaker & G. N. Watson (1963) A Course in Modern Analysis, 4th edition, §2.3, Cambridge University Press

External links
 
Jeff Cruzan. "Alternating series"

Convergence tests
Gottfried Wilhelm Leibniz